Christopher Brandeborn (born 5 March 1991) is a Swedish footballer who most recently played for IF Brommapojkarna.

Career

IF Brommapojkarna
Brandeborn left IF Brommapojkarna on 9 January 2019.

References

External links 
 

Swedish footballers
Allsvenskan players
1991 births
Living people
Degerfors IF players
Assyriska FF players
IF Brommapojkarna players
Association football midfielders